Marienthal is an unincorporated community in Wichita County, Kansas, United States.  As of the 2020 census, the population of the community and nearby areas was 64.

History
In 1892, the community was founded by a group of immigrant Volga Germans; they named it after their previous hometown of Marienthal (Tonkoschurovka), Russia (today Sovetskoya, Russia), located in the district of Saratov, on the east side of the Volga River.

The post office was established March 18, 1902.  The USPS discontinued service to Marienthal in 2011; the post office was officially closed in 2017.

Marienthal now consists of roughly 100 people, a Catholic church, a flour mill, a substance abuse treatment center, a trucking company, a bar and a grain elevator.

Demographics

For statistical purposes, the United States Census Bureau has defined Marienthal as a census-designated place (CDP).

References

Further reading

External links
 Leoti-Wichita County USD 467 school district
 Wichita County maps: Current, Historic, KDOT

German-Russian culture in Kansas
Census-designated places in Kansas
Census-designated places in Wichita County, Kansas
Ukrainian-American history